Jan Rudziński (born 22 September 1982) is a Polish badminton player. Rudziński started playing badminton when he was seven at the AZS Warszawa, and a part of the Polish national team in 1998–2004. Rudziński was a champion at the 2017 Iceland International in the men's doubles event with partner Paweł Prądziński.

Achievements

BWF International Challenge/Series (1 title, 4 runners-up) 
Men's doubles

  BWF International Challenge tournament
  BWF International Series tournament
  BWF Future Series tournament

References

External links 
 

1982 births
Living people
Sportspeople from Warsaw
Polish male badminton players